The 2010 Grand Prix de Futsal was the sixth edition of the international futsal competition of the same kind as the FIFA Futsal World Cup but with invited nations and held annually in Brazil. It was first held in 2005.

This was the first and so far the only edition of the Grand Prix de Futsal not won by Brazil.

Venues

Participating
The following 16 teams, shown with they pre-tournament rankings.

AFC (2)
 
 
CAF (2)
 
 
CONCACAF (2)
 
 

CONMEBOL (3)
 
 
 
UEFA (7)

Draw pots

Pot 1

Pot 2

Pot 3

Pot 4

Squads

Each nation submitted a squad of 15 players, including three goalkeepers.

First round

Group A

Group B

Group C

Group D

Final round

Classification 9th–16th
Ginásio da UniEvangélica

9th–16th playoffs

13th–16th playoffs

9th–12th playoffs

15th place match

13th place match

11th place match

9th place match

Classification 1st–8th
Ginásio Newton de Faria

Quarterfinals

5th–8th playoffs

Semifinals

7th place match

5th place match

3rd place match

Final

Winner

Final standing

See also
VI GRAND PRIX FUTSAL – Sorteio-Final Draw
GRAND PRIX 2010

References

External links 
Official Site

2010
2010 in Brazilian football
2010 in futsal